German Whist is a variation on classic whist for two players. Also called Chinese Whist, it is probably of British origin.

There are several variations of this game, the most important difference between them being whether all 26 tricks count or only the last 13. Another is whether trumps should be used or if the game should be about taking as many ("high play") - or as few ("low play") tricks as possible. 
While trumps or high/low makes little difference to how much luck is involved, the difference between counting all 26 tricks or only the last 13, beginning the so-called endgame as the hand is finished (beginning at the 14th trick), makes a large difference. When playing this game in two sections, the foreplay and the endgame, this version becomes the most skillful game of all for two players with a common card deck. This is because both players can calculate exactly which 13 cards the opponent has, and plan his or her play based on that knowledge. It isn't possible to know this earlier in the game.

Name 
As well as German Whist, the game goes under a variety of other names including Chinese Whist and Honeymoon Whist. In Sweden the game is sometimes known as Hamburger Whist after the German city of Hamburg.

History 
As German Whist, the game is recorded as early as 1894 in the London periodical, Home Notes, in which the winner is the one who takes the majority of the 26 tricks, scoring in points their difference in tricks.

Rules

Players and cards 
German Whist is a two player game using a standard deck of 52 cards ranked A (high) K Q J 10 9 8 7 6 5 4 3 2 (low) in each suit.

The deal 
The initial dealer is chosen by cutting the deck, and the turn to deal alternates after each hand. Each player is dealt 13 cards, dealt one at a time. The twenty-seventh card is placed face-up on the face-down pack. The suit of this face-up card is either the trump suit for the entire hand - or decides whether to play "high" (taking as many tricks as possible) or "low" (taking as few as possible). If the twenty-seventh card is a hearts or diamond, high is played. If it's a club or spade, low is played.  In the latter version the 13 first tricks almost never are counted in the score. Hence the game is split in two sections, known as foreplay and endgame. (Also other versions of deciding how the game is to be played occurs. For instance alternation between trump and high or low)

The play 
The non-dealer chooses any card to play for the first trick and the other player must follow suit if he can.  
If both cards are the same suit then the higher card wins. If they are of different suits the first player wins unless the second player played a trump, in which case the trump wins.
The winner of the trick takes the face-up card and adds it to his hand, the loser then takes the face-down card below it without showing it to his opponent. The next card in the pack is then turned over and the winner plays first in the next trick. Each player stays with 13 cards in his hand until the pack is exhausted. After this the remaining 13 tricks are played without replenishment until the cards in both players hands are exhausted.

Opening and scoring 
There are several versions of the opening, but they all depend on the colour of the 27th card (the top of the pack). For instance the 27th card can indicate which trump is to be used. However, in other versions the 27th instead indicates whether the endgame is to be played low or high. A black card means that the players should try to take as few tricks as possible, whereas a red card means they should try to take as many as possible.

There are at least two other scoring variants. The winner is the player who wins the most tricks in:
 the whole game (26 tricks), which gives a score which is more affected by luck.  
 after the pack is exhausted (13 tricks), which is the most usual variant, and for certain the most skill demanding version. Although not all cards are shown (played or captured from the pack) it's now possible to find out exactly which cards the other player has. The opponents cards are those which are not in the player's own hand and which have not been seen during the foreplay (This is also true for the first version, but half the score has already been decided at this point in the game) It is no exaggeration to state that a significantly better player will always win, if not every hand at least most hands, independently of which cards the players randomly received in the initial deal. Few other card games for two people are as difficult to master as German Whist played with foreplay and endgame.

The score count always begins at the 7th trick taken in the endgame. For instance in a high game 10 vs 3 cards gives 4 points to the one who took 10 tricks. If it was a low game, the 4 points goes to the other player.

Strategy 

The strategy for the two variants, in the first stage, is slightly different. In the first variant the player must balance winning the current trick against the probability of winning future tricks.

In the second variant the player must try to assemble the best possible hand for the endgame. This is however not as simple as it might appear. Assume hearts is trump and you begin the foreplay. You have four low hearts in your hand, but also several high-value  spades, and the top card of the deck is the two of clubs. Now despite a "worthless" card to play for, playing one's highest trump might reveal the trump situation on the opponent's hand, and you will indeed reduce the numbers of trumps (which is not your strong suit), and finally, if the opponent plays a lower trump you will know that the opponent may have a large number of trumps (which is not the case if the opponent needs to play another suit) finally by "winning" the two of clubs, you will keep the advantage of deciding which suit is played next. In general it is a good idea to attempt to keep the lead, but not always at any cost.

Playing a card of same value as the card to play for is often good, when it comes to middle-value cards, such as 7 to 10, but even more important is to choose the suit wisely. It is also important remember that when the ace is gone, the king becomes the highest value card, and if the three top value cards in a suit are gone, then the jack is the highest card in that suit, etc. Also the lowest cards are important to know, especially when the play is low. The real "key" is however to know which suit to play, in order also to win lower-value cards, though not by playing too good a card from you hand. Do not focus so much on a bad card at the top of the deck, rather think of the suit to play. If the card to play for is one you wish to have, play a safe card. If the card to play for is a middle-value card, play a slightly higher card, but just enough high for the opponent to have difficulties to "come in".

When an ace is gone, the king becomes the highest card in the suit, etc. Try to remember which card is currently the highest in each suit. Count especially trumps. But don't be afraid to play trump, as long as it is likely your opponent actually also has trump. (If it is in your interest that the number of trump cards is reduced in the endgame especially) In "low" games try to build up long suits from the bottom. For example, 2-4-6-8-Q-K-A is a good sequence to have in a low endgame. Even better is 2-3-5-7-Q-K-A, from which you can give the lead to the opponent, provided at least one card of the same siut exists on the opponent's hand. But first play all single high cards as soon as possible. When playing low, it is very easy to get trapped and having to take all the last ten tricks due to a miscalculation. The twos are often more important than aces in high or trump games. (And as soon as a "deuce" vanishes in the foreplay, the three takes its place and so on.)

By counting every suit and the highest known card in every suit one may more easily determine which card one's opponent has (or close enough), when the endgame begins. Then you also know the best way to play the endgame cards. With exception of when playing low, the endgame is close to the playing part of bridge.

Software 
Downloadable software is available from the following websites:
 MeggieSoft
 EasyWhist
 PyGermanWhist
 Android App

References 

 

Whist